Giuseppe Betori (born 25 February 1947 in Foligno, Italy) is an Italian Cardinal of the Catholic Church. He is the archbishop of Florence and the former Secretary General of the Italian Episcopal Conference.

Early life
He was ordained a priest in 1970. He received a licentiate in theology at the Pontifical Gregorian University and a doctorate in Sacred Scripture at the Pontifical Biblical Institute. He was Professor of anthropology biblical exegesis; Dean of the Theological Institute of Assisi. He also served as undersecretary of Italian Episcopal Conference from 1996 to 2001.

Bishop

He was nominated by Pope John Paul II as Secretary General of the Italian Episcopal Conference and was simultaneously appointed Titular Bishop of Falerone. He received episcopal consecration on 6 May 2001. He was confirmed as Secretary General of the Italian Episcopal Conference, for a further five-year term, on 6 April 2006.

Archbishop of Florence
Betori was appointed to replace Ennio Antonelli, who had been appointed as president of the Pontifical Council for the Family, as archbishop of Florence by Pope Benedict XVI on 8 September 2008. He received the pallium from Pope Benedict on 29 June 2009, the Feast of Saints Peter and Paul in Rome. 

On 5 November 2011 Betori survived an apparent assassination attempt. An unidentified man confronted the archbishop outside his office, shot and wounded the prelate's secretary, and waved a gun at the archbishop before escaping. Fr Paolo Brogi, the archbishop's secretary, was reportedly in satisfactory condition after surgery to repair an abdominal wound. Betori and witnesses stated that the gunman said something as he gestured toward the prelate with his firearm, but they could not understand his intent.

On 10 December 2011 he was appointed a member of the Pontifical Council for Culture for a five-year renewable term.

On 6 January 2012 it was announced that Betori would become a cardinal on 18 February. He was created Cardinal-Priest of San Marcello. In addition to his duties at Culture, Betori was appointed a member of the Congregation for Catholic Education. On 17 May 2014, Pope Francis nominated him a member of the Pontifical Council of the Laity.

He was one of the cardinal electors who participated in the 2013 papal conclave that elected Pope Francis.

Views

Life and family issues
In a 2007 speech, he identified as the new enemies of Christianity: abortion, euthanasia, the negation of sexual duality and of a family based on marriage.

Ordination of homosexuals
Betori has favoured a ban on the ordination of homosexuals, saying the word discrimination can be used where there is a right, but that a vocation is not a right but a gift.

Relationship with Benedict XVI
According to Abbé Claude Barthe, Betori is a member of the paleoliberal wing of the Roman Curia, who along with Giovanni Battista Re, constituted a kind of internal curial opposition to the decisions and policies of Pope Benedict XVI.

References

External links
 
Profile of Giuseppe Betori on Catholic Hierarchy 

1947 births
Living people
People from Foligno
21st-century Italian cardinals
Roman Catholic archbishops of Florence
Members of the Pontifical Council for Culture
Members of the Congregation for Catholic Education
Members of the Congregation for the Clergy
Cardinals created by Pope Benedict XVI
Pontifical Biblical Institute alumni
Pontifical Gregorian University alumni
21st-century Italian Roman Catholic archbishops